Yasin Sancak (born September 9, 1978 in İstanbul) is a Turkish volleyball player. He is 199 cm and plays as middle blocker.  He played 63 times for the national team and also played for Netaş, Erdemir, Arkas Spor, Galatasaray, Ziraat Bankası, Fenerbahçe. He is signed for Galatasaray

Honours and awards
 4 times Turkish Men's Volleyball League Champion
 1 time Turkish Cup Champion
 2005 Summer Universiade Champion
 2009 Balkan Cup Champion

External links 
 Galatasaray Official Website

References

1979 births
Living people
Volleyball players from Istanbul
Turkish men's volleyball players
Galatasaray S.K. (men's volleyball) players
Fenerbahçe volleyballers
Arkas Spor volleyball players
Ziraat Bankası volleyball players
Universiade medalists in volleyball
Universiade gold medalists for Turkey